Box of Bongwater is a career-spanning four-disc box-set of the band Bongwater, released on October 20, 1998 through Shimmy Disc. It contains almost all of the band's recorded output, including four studio albums, an EP, a single, and an edit of a compilation track. The tracks were completely remastered by Alan Douches and Kramer for their inclusion in the set.

Track listing

Personnel 
Adapted from the Box of Bongwater liner notes.
Bongwater
 Randolph A. Hudson III – guitar
 Kramer – vocals, instruments, engineering, production
 David Licht – drums, percussion
 Ann Magnuson – vocals
 Dave Rick – guitar
Production and additional personnel
 Dave Bias – art direction
 Alan Douches – remastering
 Laurie Henzel – art direction
 Michael Lavine – photography
 Michael Macioce – photography
 Jim Shaw – art direction

Release history

References

External links 
 Box of Bongwater at Discogs (list of releases)

1998 compilation albums
Albums produced by Kramer (musician)
Bongwater (band) albums
Shimmy Disc compilation albums